Rodolfo Plaza Montero (nicknamed El Cabro because of his speed) was born July 27, 1909 and was a Bolivian football player, businessman and revolutionary. He played in the amateur Federación Boliviana de Fútbol Club Bolivar and was the only player to become its coach and President from 1956 to 1963.
He was a member of the national team and participated in the 1938 Juegos Bolivarianos.

He also took up arms and was part of the planning members of the Revolution of 1952 that allowed Victor Paz Estensoro to assume the presidency. Paz was the duly elected president in the 1951 elections.

Unlike Walter Guevara Arze, Carlos Montenegro, Augusto Céspedes, Fernando Iturralde Chinel, Armando Arce, Javier del Granado, Rafael Otazo Vargas-Bozo, Jorge T. Lavadenz, Alfonso Montaño Lino, Jose Camaho Arancivia, José Cuadros Quiroga, Germán Monroy Block, Rodolfo Costas, Raúl Molina Gutiérrez, Rigoberto Armaza Lopera and others, Rodolfo Plaza Montero refused to accept any official position with the new government and dedicated his time to his import and export business.

Many experts, football critics, former players, current players and football fans regard Plaza as one of the best amateur players of Bolivian fútbol comparable to the likes of Mario Alborta, Roberto Soto and others.
Rodolfo Plaza Montero had been major national player both for Bolivar and the national team. As the team's only player to serve as coach and president, this makes him the only person in the history of Bolivian fútbol to be a champion as a player, coach and president.

Early years
Rodolfo was the fifth son born to Miguel Plaza Coca and Asteria Montero. He was born in Cochabamba, Bolivia. His older brothers; Miguel Plaza Montero, Andres Plaza Montero and Juan Plaza Montero were great athletes in their own merits. Miguel was a great fútbol player, Andrés was a national boxing champion who beat Froilan Pinilla by a few points. Andres Plaza Montero played fútbol for The Strongest, the classic nemesis of Bolivar and Juan Plaza Montero was a national boxing champion in Chile, staging most of his fights in Valparaiso.

Rodolfo started his athletic career as a boxer. He fought in preliminary bouts when his older brother Andres beat Froilan Pinilla in the main event.

The four brothers spent some time in Chile and arrived in La Paz in 1923.

Rodolfo attended primary school leaving it while in the third grade. He worked for a printing press where he improved his vocabulary while setting up the press.

He also learned the trade of tailor.

He started his fútbol career early and started playing for Bolivar in 1929 at age 20. In 1931, Bolivar won its first championship in what was called Asociación de Fútbol de La Paz.
 
The fútbol games were cancelled in 1932 and 1933 . In 1932 Rodolfo was called to serve in the Bolivian army and was sent to the front lines where he served as a suboficial (Chief Warrant Officer). He was wounded in the left arm by a bullet. In 1933, while in the Gran Chaco (the largest dry forest in South America and the continent’s most extensive forested region after Amazonia), Rodolfo caught yellow fever and almost died. For the rest of his life, he asserted that the cure of yellow fever was the thermal baths of  Urmiri where he spent most of 1934.
 
Rodolfo was awarded the "Benemerito de la Guerra del Chaco Award" (Hero of the Chaco War) but chose not to collect any benefits.

Club career
El Cabro Plaza and his team won the championships of The Bolivian Amateur Fútbol League (Liga de Fútbol Amateur Boliviano) six times in 1931, 1937, 1939, 1940, 1941, 1942. In addition, El Cabro Plaza won the championship in 1956 as coach and president.

One of Rodolfo's teammates, Walter "Chingolo" Orozco, is considered one of the icons of the team. Orozco stated that Club Bolivar became The Academy in the 1930s and 1940s when Orozco, Alborta, El Cabro Plaza, Angulo, Teran, Velasco, Durandal, Molina, Saravia and others played for the team. That team was composed by the subtlety of Orozco, the gallantry of Mario Alborta, the power of  Kullu Baldellón, firmness and poise of El Cabro Plaza.

International career

1938 Juegos Bolivarianos
22 August 1938, El Cabro Plaza scored the two goals to beat Ecuador 2-1 and give Bolivia the Silver Medal of the tournament.

Style of play
El Cabro Plaza had speed, a powerful left leg and great vision and knowledge of the game. He was a team player and played in the old style alignment that had 1 Goalkeeper, 2 Backs 3 Midfielders and 5 forwards. In his days there were no numbers assigned to the club jerseys but he would sport number 7 (Left Wing) in the 1950s and 1960s.
  
El Cabro Plaza seemed to know where every player in the field was going and his centers of the ball were feared by the opposing midfielders, backs and goalkeepers,
El Cabro scored many goals with powerful shots outside the penalty box.
El Cabro was a very aggressive player that did not fear shoulder to shoulder bumps and could head the ball into the net when corner kicks were served by the right wing.
 
This picture shows both, Miguel Plaza Montero and Rodolfo Plaza Montero during the last days amateur fútbol

The most valuable player, Ultima Hora.
In 1957 that "Bolívar" of golden times of the 1930s and 1940s had fielded some insurmountable "cracks" in an old timers game in the Hernando Silez Stadium.

Mario Alborta was geometrically precise, almost intellectual and classical perfection. That goal he scored in Santiago de Chile, the first minute, was unique in the annals of South American football. By the end, Nicomedes Tapia, fast and efficacious, and the bold Cabro Plaza, a real kid since age 18 became the terror of the archers, great player who became president of the Club. His eagle eye dominated the entire field. Nobody beat him in the accuracy of the passes when he opened the game by the left wing or in the power of free kicks. Bold goalkeepers: Ponce, and the great Angel Saavedra Velasco so hard to beat. 

Also, one should remember great players like Aguilar, Segaline, Bustamante, Sainz, Fernando Velasco, Arturo Plaza, Gualberto Saravia, Quiroga. And on defense relive the great figures of Durandal and Angulo, the ball control of Beriche Rengel.

On the Monday edition's of the daily newspaper Ultima Hora the sports page had a section where the most valuable player (el mejor jugador del domingo) was featured. On that Monday El Cabro made the feature ebem hough the top card of the afternoon had stars like Victor Augustin Ugarte and Mario Mena.
 
Mario Alborta (hand over his face) died 10 years later in January 1976

Political views and a revolutionary
In the 1940s Rodolfo Plaza and his brothers Miguel Y Andres had set up store fronts within a block of each other. Rodolfo's business was across the Telégrafos in Ayacucho street. Andres had his shop set up at the opposite corner on the Post Office in the corner of Potosi street and Ayacucho Street. Miguel had his shop located a block from Andres' located in Potosi street.

The three brothers were successful businessmen.

Rodolfo was the only one of the three that fought in the Chaco War, He started his involvement in politics influenced by the emergence of Razón de Patria (a hitherto-secret military faction known as Radepa (Razón de Patria, or Fatherland's Cause) established by veteran military officers of the Bolivian Army disappointment of the way President [Daniel Salamanca Urey] managed the war.

The massacres of Catavi and Siglo XX the ongoing Spanish Civil War also had influenced Rodolfo's views.
He showed loyalty to his veteran comrades and assisted them financially and by publishing a left wing circular called Alambre de Púa edited by a fellow whose last name was Murillo. It is said that the Government of the Sexenio had tortured Murillo and forced him to drink motor oil. The six years preceding the 1952 Revolution are known as the Sexenio, members of the Conservative Party tried to stem the growth of the left, but they ultimately failed because they could not halt the economic decline and control the growing social unrest.

His time as a political prisoner.

In 1946, with the fall of Villarroel's presidency, he intervened politically with the "Movimiento Nacionalista Revolucionario". In the Civil War of 1948 Rodolfo Plaza and Cesar Lafaye ended up political prisoners and roommates. One of Rodolfo's and Cesar delightful pastimes was to walk the memory lanes of fútbol while Rodolfo wore his team's jersey.

Rodolfo was arrested and confined without the benefit of Habeas Corpus. Habeas Corpus had been suspended during the Sexenio. He spent about three months of political confinement in Apolo and about two months in the Lake Titicaca island of Coati.

Rodolfo seldom if ever spoke about the experiences of his confinements except that most of the time he wore the Jersey of his beloved Bolivar.

The Revolution of 1952
He was a revolutionary fighter. He took active part of the popular insurrection of the historic "9 de Abril (1952) revolution", with Juan Lechin, Rodolfo fought in Miraflores and together with Lechin and Julio Pantoja took over the presidential palace in Plaza Murillo (Palacio de Gobierno.

All the time that the "Movimiento Nacionalista Revolucionario" was in power he never accepted nor requested a public office, His life was dedicated to sports and to the Club Bolivar.

Club management
Rodolfo Plaza Montero became president of the club at a time when Club Bolivar was on the verge of insolvency. As president Rodolfo Plaza Montero used his own funds to compensate players. Some of the players that were compensated totally by using his own funds include Mario Mena, Augustin Ugarte, Santos, Rico, Villagran, Mugertegi, Flores and others.

Rodolfo Plaza Montero financial help proved to be indispensable to win the 1956 championship.

As president he was instrumental in the acquiring of the lots in Tembladerani where the club built Simon Bolivar stadium  that can seat 25,000 fans.

Some of the players that were compensated totally by using his own funds include Mario Mena, Augustin Ugarte, Santos, Rico, Villagran, Mugertegi, Flores and others.

Rodolfo Plaza Montero was a great scout and recruiter for the club, when he signed young and promising players, he would pay out of his own funds for transportation, room and board and expenses for these youngsters.

El Cabro Plaza's vision of his club included not only the development of new players competing in the "cuartas especiales" tournaments but he seeded the vision of what would take more than a decade as an incubator of great players like Marco "El Diablo" Etcheverry, Alumnus of Taihuichi Fútbol Academy.

In 1971, Rodolfo Plaza Montero shared with Mario Mercado his vision of transforming the club into a self-sustaining professional entity. Mario Mercado took notes and promised Rodolfo that if he ever became president of the club he would look at the plan and in that way repay Rodolfo the enormous amounts of money that Rodolfo spent supporting the club.

Mario Mercado never honored his word even though he used Rodolfo's intellectual property to advance the club.
Mario Mercado did not attend Rodolfo's funeral in December 2, 1988, perhaps because they did not share convergent political views. Mercado was a member of Banzer's ADN.

Personal life
Rodolfo had a charisma and the looks to persuade anyone on business transactions. This charisma was mixed with naiveté that blinded him when he trusted his partners with his business interests.

In 1946 he trusted Jorge Hinojosa to run "Almacenes Plaza" while he was confined to the province of Apolo. Hinojosa emptied Rodolfo's bank account and moved to San Francisco.

In 1953 Rodolfo travelled to New York City on a business trip and left Eduardo Bazaure to run his business except that Bazaure did not have access to the bank account except to make deposits. Bazaure emptied the storerooms where Rodolfo stored several hundred 100 pound bags of rice and smuggled them to Peru.

In 1982, he purchased all the ingredients to manufacture Tri-Mate and had as a partner a man with the last name of Soliz. Soliz also took advantage of Rodolfo's naïveté.

Rodolfo was a great athlete and he was a good boxer. It ran in the family, Andres Plaza Montero Was national boxing champ and Juan Plaza Montero was boxing champ of Valparaiso Chile.

He had the opportunity to get his picture with Jack Dempsey when he visited New York.
Rodolfo gave financial assistance to Mario Bueno, a heart weight boxer who was also an official in the Bolivia Police.
He always spoke about the fight between Firpo and Dempsey. He liked Pascual Perez from Argentina and Mike Tyson.
When watching boxing results on the news reels shown at the movies, he always would make conversation about that fight for days on end.

Rodolfo was an avid tennis player who played the sport every Saturday at the Sucre Tennis Club.
Rodolfo had two sons with Raquel Barrientos, two daughters one from his second marriage and one out of wedlock.

In popular culture
Traditionalist "Juan Vargas" Museum is a municipal museum in La Paz, Bolivia. Its local name is Museo Costumbrista "Juan Vargas" and is located opposite the park Riosinho in La Paz, Bolivia. The museum makes historical reference to customs typical to the city of La Paz.

The building features are consistent with the architectural richness of the streets Jaen, Ingavi and Pichincha.
In this museum there are valuable pieces, relics and memorabilia dating from the early years of the Colony and the Republic to today.

The Museum jealously guards valuable works of traditions and customs paceñas (of La Paz) so that they do not get lost in time. The house was built in the Colonial era and the museum is named after the first mayor of the city of La Paz .
Among the most representative works available to the public, we find historical events such as the hanging of Murillo or martyrdom Tupac Katari; outstanding characters from the sixteenth to the twentieth centuries made of clay; a miniature replica, made of ceramic, the foundation of La Paz. In addition to pre-Columbian pictures of drums, some paintings of old La Paz and scenes of the old city tram.

Rodolfo Plaza Montero is the only Player, Coach and President of any fútbol club represented in the Museo Costumbrista in a minituarized mock up of the Estadio La Paz playing for Bolivar against its nemesis The Strongest.

Last days
After many years of walking the steep streets of La Paz without losing wind and faster than most and in his late seventies, Rodolfo attended his last fútbol game in Hernando Siles Stadium. The excitement of the game caused Rodolfo to have a massive heart attack from which he could not recover. In that game Bolivar clinched the championship.
All the newspapers of La Paz had obituaries about his death and his funeral was attended by a multitude of people some of whom were personal friends and some that were fans of his beloved club Bolivar. This happened November 30, 1988. He was buried December 2, 1988 in the Pavilion of Veterans of the Chaco War in the General Cemetery of La Paz.

1909 births
1988 deaths
Bolivian footballers
Association footballers not categorized by position